Butch McCain is an American actor, an award winning broadcaster, producer and one-half of the singing-songwriting team, The McCain Brothers.  Butch appeared as TV reporter Joachim West in MGM's Bio-Dome, the character, Creel, in Roger Corman's remake Humanoids From The Deep, dual roles as a uni-browed farmer and deputy in Bruce Campbell's My Name Is Bruce, and most recently as Mayor Eddie Modry in Dragon Soldiers. Butch and his brother, Ben McCain, wrote and performed the theme song of My Name is Bruce titled "The Legend of Guan Di". Butch is a multi-award winning broadcaster including Best Weathercaster of the year two years in a row by the Colorado Broadcasters Association.

Early life 
Butch McCain was born in Muleshoe, Texas, and raised on a farm near Bovina in Parmer County, Texas. McCain is a graduate of Bovina High School, South Plains College in Levelland, Texas, and West Texas State University now West Texas A&M University in Canyon, Texas.

Film and television 
From 1981 to 1994, Butch McCain and his brother Ben McCain worked at NBC affiliate KTVY (now KFOR-TV) and eventually at ABC affiliate KOCO-TV, where they also anchored that station's noon newscast. The McCain brothers, with Ben anchoring the news and Butch forecasting the weather, hosted a morning TV show for 12 years (six each on KTVY and KOCO).

While hosting their daily morning television program, the brothers appeared on the syndicated TV show Hee Haw, as well as ABC soap operas General Hospital, All My Children, and Loving.

Butch and his brother Ben have appeared in numerous films together, including MGM's cult classic Bio-Dome, Roger Corman's Humanoids from the Deep, and Bruce Campbell's My Name is Bruce, where they wrote and performed the theme song, "The Legend of Guan Di". In the movie, Ben plays the mayor and Butch has dual roles as the sheriff and a uni-browed farmer. In a 1997, Daily Variety article, columnist Andrew Hindes described the McCain Brothers as "multi-hyphenated".  Butch also appeared in Jonás Cuarón's Desierto.

Butch currently works as the evening weather anchor for the NBC affiliate KKCO in Grand Junction, Colorado.

Music 
Butch and Ben form the songwriting duo, the McCain Brothers. They recorded the country single, “If Love Was a Crime I Couldn't Get Arrested", which went number one on 50,000-watt KOMA radio. They also hosted a syndicated TV music show called The McCain Brothers Show.

References

External links 
 
 McCain Brothers
 Butch McCain NBC 11 News

Living people
Male actors from Texas
People from Muleshoe, Texas
South Plains College alumni
People from Parmer County, Texas
Television anchors from Oklahoma City
Journalists from Texas
Year of birth missing (living people)